Aloma Isaac Junior (born November 7, 1991) known by his stage name Zicsaloma is a Nigerian, comic skit maker, actor and singer. He rose to prominence for comedic videos he posts to Instagram, and TikTok.

Early life and education
Zicsaloma was born in Kaduna State and originally hails from Abia State. He attended the Sacred Heart Primary School for his primary education and Airforce Secondary School for his secondary education. He studied English and Literary Studies at the Abia State University.

Career
Prior to becoming a comedian, Zicsaloma contested in The Voice Nigeria season 2 competition and got eliminated in the semi-finals. After bagging his degree, he embarked on full time comedy in 2017, and became an internet sensation after his viral comic skit on TikTok.

References

External links 
Aloma Isaac Junior on Instagram

1991 births
Living people
Nigerian male comedians
Nigerian TikTokers